Mario Antonio Núñez Villarreal (born 2 March 1976) is a Chilean former footballer well remembered for his spell at O'Higgins. He played as a striker.

International career
He made 7 appearances and scored two goals for the Chile national team in 2000.

Personal life
His nickname is Oso (Bear), but he doesn't know its origin.

After his retirement from football, he has worked in the mining industry, at the El Teniente specifically.

His son, Daniel, is a professional tennis player.

Honours

Club
Provincial Osorno
 Primera B (1): 2007

International
Chile
  (1):

Individual
 Primera B de Chile Top-Scorer (2): 1998, 2007
 Primera División de Chile Top-Scorer (1): 1999
 Primera División de Chile Ideal Team (1): 
 IFFHS World's Best Top Division Goal Scorer Second place: 1999

References

External links
 
 
 Mario Núñez at playmakerstats.com (English version of ceroacero.es)

1976 births
Living people
People from Rancagua
Chilean footballers
Chilean expatriate footballers
Chile international footballers
Chilean Primera División players
Primera B de Chile players
O'Higgins F.C. footballers
Club Deportivo Universidad Católica footballers
Club Deportivo Palestino footballers
Rangers de Talca footballers
Provincial Osorno footballers
Coquimbo Unido footballers
Deportes Magallanes footballers
Magallanes footballers
Argentine Primera División players
Club Atlético Independiente footballers
PFC Naftex Burgas players
Chilean expatriate sportspeople in Argentina
Chilean expatriate sportspeople in Bulgaria
Expatriate footballers in Argentina
Expatriate footballers in Bulgaria
Instituto O'Higgins de Rancagua alumni
Association football forwards